The Ontario Derby is a Canadian Thoroughbred horse race run annually in mid-October at Woodbine Racetrack in Toronto, Ontario. A Grade III stakes since 2012, it is open to three-year-old horses. Raced over a distance of  miles (9 furlongs) on Tapeta, the Ontario Derby currently offers a purse of Can$150,000.

Inaugurated in 1972 as the Colonel R. S. McLaughlin Handicap, the race was renamed the Ontario Derby for the 2003 running. Originally contested at  miles, it was changed to its current -mile distance in 1992.

Records
Speed record: 
 1:48.30 – Ami's Gizmo (2016) (at current distance of  miles on Tapeta) – new track record
 1:49.38 – Sand Cove (2008) (at current distance of  miles on Polytrack)
 1:49.45 – Kiss A Native (2000) (at current distance of  miles on natural dirt)

Most wins by an owner:
 3 – Sam-Son Farm (1974, 1987, 2013)
 2 – Frank Stronach (1983, 1994)
 2 – Frank DiGiulio, Jr. (1989, 2001)
 2 – Minshall Farms (1995, 1996)
 2 – Gus Schickedanz (1999, 2003)

Most wins by a jockey:
 5 – Sandy Hawley (1972, 1975, 1977, 1989, 1991)

Most wins by a trainer:
 4 – Roger Attfield (1976, 1986, 2005, 2008)
 4 – Mark E. Casse (2012 ,2014 ,2018, 2021)

Winners of the Ontario Derby

* In 1996 Steady Climb finished first but was disqualified and set back to second place.

See also
 List of Canadian flat horse races

References

External links
 The Ontario Derby at Pedigree Query
 2007 Ontario Derby at the NTRA

Graded stakes races in Canada
Flat horse races for three-year-olds
Recurring sporting events established in 1972
Woodbine Racetrack
1972 establishments in Ontario